Roger Federer’s 2006 season was dominant, finishing the year with a 92–5 record. The world No. 1 maintained his ranking for the full calendar year and reached all four major finals in 2006, winning three of them. His only loss at the majors came against Rafael Nadal in the French Open final in four sets, 6–1, 1–6, 4–6, 6–7(4–7). This was the first time they had met in a major final. In the other three majors of the season, Federer defeated Nadal in the final of Wimbledon, 6–0, 7–6(7–5), 6–7(2–7), 6–3. He defeated Marcos Baghdatis, 5–7, 7–5, 6–0, 6–2, at the Australian Open and Andy Roddick, 6–2, 4–6, 7–5, 6–1, at the US Open.

In addition, Federer contested six Masters finals (out of the seven events he entered), winning four on hardcourt and losing two on clay to Nadal. Also, Federer won one ATP 500 series event in Tokyo, three ATP 250 series events in Doha, Halle, and Basel, and captured the year-end championship for the third time in his career.

In December 2011, Stephen Tignor, chief editorial writer for Tennis.com, ranked Federer's 2006 season as the second greatest Open Era season, behind Rod Laver's Grand Slam year of 1969.

Year summary
Federer won three of the four Grand Slam singles tournaments for the second time and ended the year ranked world No. 1, with his points total being several thousand ahead of world No. 2 Nadal.

Early hard court season

Federer started the year off by winning the Qatar Open in Doha. This was his second consecutive championship in Doha, he defeated Frenchman Gaël Monfils 6–3, 7–6(7–5) in the final.

After traveling down under, Federer won the year's first Grand Slam tournament, the Australian Open, by defeating Cypriot Marcos Baghdatis in four sets. This was Federer's seventh consecutive victory in a Grand Slam final (2003 Wimbledon – 2006 Australian Open), a record to start a career, and second overall only to Pete Sampras's eight consecutive wins (1995 Wimbledon – 2000 Wimbledon). This was Federer's 7th Grand Slam title, which tied him for sixth place in the open era with John McEnroe and Mats Wilander.

Moving back to the Middle East, Federer reached the finals of the Dubai Tennis Championships without losing a set before losing to his budding arch-rival Rafael Nadal 6–2, 4–6, 4–6. This ended the 16-match winning streak that he had started the 2006 season on. It was also the first time Federer had lost a match on a hard court in over a year, the last time coming 13 months earlier in the semifinals of the 2005 Australian Open.

Federer successfully defended his Masters title at the Pacific Life Open in Indian Wells, California, defeating American James Blake in the final 7–5, 6–3, 6–0. This was his third consecutive title in Indian Wells, which set the tournament record for most consecutive titles. This third championship also tied Michael Chang's record of three titles in Indian Wells.

Two weeks later he also successfully defended his Masters title at the Sony Ericsson Open in Miami, Florida, defeating Croatian Ivan Ljubičić in the final 7–6(7–5), 7–6(7–4), 7–6(8–6). With his victory in Miami he picked up his second masters title of the year, and became the first player ever to win the grueling Indian Wells-Key Biscayne double in consecutive years.

Clay court season

Federer started the clay-court season by reaching the final of the ATP Masters Series event at Monte Carlo. He opened the tournament with a scare needing three sets to defeat an 18-year-old Novak Djokovic; this was the first match between the two rivals, who have played in 50 matches as of August 2021. After reaching the final he lost in four sets to Nadal 2–6, 7–6(7–2), 3–6, 6–7(5–7).

In Italy Federer had a difficult road to the finals of Rome defeating Nicolás Almagro 6–3, 6–7(2–7), 7–5 in the quarters and David Nalbandian 6–3, 3–6, 7–6(7–5) in the semifinals. His encounter with Rafael Nadal in the finals saw Federer losing 7–6(7–0), 6–7(5–7), 4–6, 6–2, 6–7(5–7) in a five-set, five-hour and five-minute match that culminated in a decisive 7-5 tiebreak. Federer had held two championship points at 6–5 in the fifth set. Because of the physicality and grueling nature of the match, both players skipped the Hamburg Masters the following week.

Federer only dropped two sets en route to the first French Open final of his career. He met the reigning champion Rafael Nadal in the final. Federer had gone undefeated in 2006 except against Nadal, compiling a 44–3 record heading into the finals. He got off to a fast start winning the first set decisively 6–1. But the relentless nature of Nadal's play, constantly hitting high bouncing shots to Federer's one-handed backhand, proved a devastating formula. Federer eventually lost the match in a fourth-set tiebreaker 6–1, 1–6, 4–6, 6–7(4–7). This ended the many predictions of Federer winning the calendar year Grand Slam in 2006. Although the French Open title eluded him, Federer became one of only two active players who had reached the finals of all four Grand Slam singles tournaments, the other being Andre Agassi.

Grass court season

Federer won his fourth consecutive title at the Gerry Weber Open in Halle, Germany. Federer had three close third set victories en route to making the final, including a thrilling triple tiebreak match against Olivier Rochus in the quarterfinals 6–7(2–7), 7–6(11–9), 7–6(7–5). In the final he defeated Tomáš Berdych 6–0, 6–7(4–7), 6–2.

Federer entered Wimbledon as the top seed, trying to become the first man since Pete Sampras (1997–2000) to win Wimbledon in four consecutive years. Federer raced through the tournament without dropping a set and met his arch-rival Rafael Nadal in the finals. Federer had not defeated Nadal all season going 0–4 against Nadal but 5–4 overall heading into the final. Federer again thrashed Nadal in the first set, the same way he had in the opening set at Roland Garros, bageling the Spaniard 6–0. The second set was much closer with Federer taking the tiebreaker 7–5. Federer surrendered his first set of the tournament when he lost the third set in a tiebreaker 2–7. In the fourth set Federer reasserted his superior grass court play and took it by a score of 6–3. Federer won the final 6–0, 7–6(7–5), 6–7(2–7), 6–3. This was his fourth Wimbledon title and his 8th Grand Slam title of his career. With this Major title win he tied Andre Agassi, Jimmy Connors, and Ivan Lendl for sixth on the all-time Grand Slam list behind Bill Tilden (10), Rod Laver and Björn Borg (11), Roy Emerson (12), and Pete Sampras (14). After Wimbledon, Federer set his sights on winning the US Open.

Summer hard court season

Federer then started his North American tour by winning his second Rogers Cup title in Toronto, defeating Richard Gasquet of France in the final 2–6, 6–3, 6–2.

After his victory in Toronto, Federer entered the Cincinnati Masters as the defending champion looking to tie the all-time record he and Nadal set in 2005 of four masters titles in a single season. After reaching the finals of his first eleven tournaments in 2006, Federer was upset by 19-year-old British upstart Andy Murray. Following this loss to Murray, Federer would not lose another match for the remainder of the year. He finished the season with a perfect record of 29–0 (this would continue into 2007 and be part of his career best 41-match winning streak).

During the US Open, the year's last Grand Slam tournament, he defeated American Andy Roddick in four sets 6–2, 4–6, 7–5, 6–1 for his third consecutive title at Flushing Meadows. During the open era, 2006 is the only year in which the same man (Federer) and woman (Justine Henin) reached the finals of all four Grand Slams. This was Federer's 9th Grand Slam title, which put him in sole possession of 6th place on the all-time Grand Slam list.

Fall indoor season

Tokyo was the last outdoor event that Federer participated in during the season. He defeated Tim Henman in the final, 6–3, 6–3.

With victory in Asia, Federer turned his focus to the indoor circuit of Europe. He entered the Madrid Masters for the first time since 2003. After a close third-round match against Robin Söderling, Federer defeated Fernando González 7–5, 6–1, 6–0 in the final. This was his fourth Masters title of the year, which tied the all-time record held by himself and Nadal in 2005.

Federer entered his hometown tournament, the Swiss Indoors held in Basel, having never won it despite having reached the final in 2000 and 2001. Federer won a final-set tiebreaker against Paradorn Srichaphan in the semifinals, to advance to the final where he defeated González, 6–3, 6–2, 7–6(7–3). This victory was especially touching for Federer who had grown up in Basel and had been a ball boy at the tournament during his youth.

At the year-ending Tennis Masters Cup in Shanghai, Federer defeated the defending champion David Nalbandian during the round-robin stage. He also scored his second victory of the year over Nadal, 6–4, 7–5 in a thrilling semifinal matchup of the top 2 players in the world. Federer then resoundingly defeated James Blake, 6–0, 6–3, 6–4, in the final to win his third Masters Cup title.

Season accomplishments
Federer won 12 titles in 2006, which included three Grand Slam titles, four ATP Masters titles, and the Tennis Masters Cup. During the year, he lost to only two players, Nadal in the French Open, Rome, Monte Carlo, and Dubai finals; and Andy Murray in the second round of the Masters Series tournament in Cincinnati. The Cincinnati loss to Murray was Federer's only straight-set loss of the year and the only tournament out of 17 in which he did not reach the final. His win–loss record for the 2006 season was 92–5, falling slightly behind his 2005 season record of 81–4.

Matches

Grand Slam performance

All matches

Singles

2006 Tournament schedule

Singles schedule

Yearly records

Finals

Singles: 16 (12–4)

Prize Money Earnings

See also
Roger Federer
Roger Federer career statistics

References

External links
  
 ATP tour profile

2006
Federer season
2006 in Swiss tennis
2006 in Swiss sport